Kamarooka is a locality in the City of Greater Bendigo, Victoria, Australia with a small section in the Shire of Loddon.

History 
Kamarooka was originally called "Piccaninny Creek Station" after a large pastoral run in the area. It was then renamed "Kamarooka" from an Aboriginal word meaning "Wait a While". In 1901 a Methodist church opened and the public hall was built.

References 

Suburbs of Bendigo
Bendigo